Fu Jing (born June 29, 1995) is a Chinese singer and actress signed under Banana Culture Music Co., Ltd. After finishing tenth in Tencent's girl group survival show Produce 101, she debuted as a member of Rocket Girls 101.

Early life 
Fu was born on June 29, 1995 in Shaoyang, Hunan. She is the second child in the family. She has an elder sister, Fu Ying, a younger sister and a younger brother. She started working in 2013, at the age of 18. She tried being a dance teacher and yoga trainer besides others. Besides working, she also entered Xiangnan University where she completed her scholarship. In 2016, she participated in the Trainee18 recruitment and became a trainee under Banana Culture Music Co., Ltd.. She appeared in Hunan Television television series Happy Camp's advertisement screen and the Youku series titled Mars Intelligence Agency.

Career

Trainee 
In 2017, she officially became a member of Trainee18. She first performed with the members of Trainee18 at the B.I.G Carnival.
In April 2018, she represented Trainee18 female group to participate in China's Produce 101. In May, she participated in the “Walking the Public Welfare Season” theme activity “Walking Dance”. She uploaded her own “walking dance” video on her social media, hoping to call on people to walk daily and make donations.

During Produce 101 
In her first performance, she came in second place for the Center position (C) under the strength category and formed the team with Wang Mohan, Qi YanDi, Wang Ting, etc.  and sang the song "No need to spend money". In the second performance also as the C position, she formed a team with Zhang Zining, Qi YanDi and Luo Yijia, singing the song "Liar". Her third performance was performed together with Wu Xuanyi, Fan Wei, Su Yuqi, Luo Yijia, and Gao Yingxi singing the song "Shiny".
In June, after several knockouts rounds, she was nominated to be in the top 22 of "Produce 101" finals. At the same time, she also filmed a set of plane photo for the fashion magazine "Red Show GRAZIA".
On 23 June, she clinch the 10th position out of 11 members with Meng Meiqi emerging as the 1st, followed Wu Xuanyi, Yang Chaoyue, Duan Aojuan, Yamy, Lai Meiyun, Zhang Zining, Sunnee, Li ZiTing and Xu Mengjie as the last member. The team was then name as Rocket Girls 101.

Debut as Rocket Girls 101
On 23 June 2018, she officially debuted and released the single "Rocket Girls"; the next day, participated in Hunan Satellite TV "Happy China Graduation Songs", completed the first group show.
On 18 August, the group's first mini-album "Collide" was released with the title song "Collide", and a new song conference was held on the same day. The second, third and fourth "Light", "Sailor Moon" and "Born to Win" was released on 14, 28 September and 12 October respectively. During countdown, Rocket Girl 101 participated in the Hunan Satellite TV "Happy China 2018-2019 New Year Concert" performance.

Set Up Personal Studio 
After Rocket Girls 101 disband on 23 June 2020, she officially set up her personal studio on 24 June 2020. She then release her first EP.

Discography

Solo

Soundtrack appearances

Filmography

Television series

Variety and reality shows

References

External links
 Fu Jing Weibo
 Fu Jing Instagram

Living people
1995 births
Actresses from Hunan
Singers from Hunan
People from Shaoyang
Rocket Girls 101 members
C-pop singers
Produce 101 (Chinese TV series) contestants